Copy Cats  was a British television comedy impressions sketch programme produced by LWT for ITV from 30 November 1985 to 5 December 1987. It was a revival of the quickfire sketch  format of 1970s show Who Do You Do? and featured Aiden J. Harvey and Johnny More who were stars of the earlier show.

Featured performers

Series 1
Bobby Davro
Aiden J. Harvey
Jessica Martin
Andrew O'Connor
Mike Osman
Allan Stewart
Gary Wilmot: 
Johnny More

Series 2 
 Hilary O'Neil
Bobby Davro
Aiden J. Harvey
Jessica Martin
Andrew O'Connor
Mike Osman
Allan Stewart

Series 3
Aiden J. Harvey
Jessica Martin
Andrew O'Connor
Mike Osman
Allan Stewart
 Hilary O'Neil
 Mark Walker

Series overview

 Series 1: 30 November 1985  - 18 January 1986:  8 episodes. 
 Series 2: 30 August - 4 October 1986  :  6 episodes 
 Series 3: 31 October - 5 December 1987:  6 episodes

References

External links
 

1985 British television series debuts
1987 British television series endings
1980s British television sketch shows
British comedy television shows
ITV comedy
Television series by ITV Studios
London Weekend Television shows
English-language television shows